John Appleby is a 20th-century British author of pulp novels, many of them mysteries or suspense fiction. His works include Captive City, which was made into a film, Conquered City.

Publications
Tin trumpet at dawn (London : Werner Laurie, 1950) OCLC 10746780 
 Aphrodite Means Death. Sydney: Shakespeare Head, 1952. OCLC 223707016. "American edition has title: The arms of Venus." 
Barbary Hoard. New York: Coward-McCann, 1952. OCLC 1662872
The Singing Cave.  Laurie, 1952. OCLC 30168577
The Dark Corsican.   Werner Laurie, UK, 1953
Stars in the Water. New York: Coward-McCann, 1953. OCLC 1662348.  Published in the United States by Dell in 1958, with the title "Grounds for Murder" 
Venice Preserve Me. Hodder & Stoughton, 1954. OCLC 30198989
The Captive City New York: W. Sloane Associates, 1955. OCLC 1662373
The Secret Mountains. Hodder & Stoughton, 1955 OCLC 59016005
The Stuffed Swan. London: Hodder and Stoughton, 1956. OCLC 12652460
The Bad Summer. New York: I. Washburn, 1958. OCLC 1747219
The Loving Strangers. London: Hodder and Stoughton, 1968.

References

External links 
 

British male writers